Madingou (can also be written as Madingu) is a town located in southern Republic of the Congo.  It is the capital city of the Madingou District and the Bouenza Region.

Transport 

It is served by a station on the Congo-Ocean Railway.

Bouenza Department
Populated places in the Republic of the Congo